Erle Wiltshire (born 18 January 1973 in Pyin U Lwin, Mandalay) is a former flyweight boxer from Australia, who was born in Burma. He represented his second country at the 2000 Summer Olympics in Sydney, Australia. There he was eliminated in the first round by France's Jérôme Thomas.

Wiltshire won the Australian championship in his division in 1997, 1998 and 2003, when he also claimed a gold medal at the International Invitational tournament in Sydney in December, 1999.

He was an Australian Institute of Sport scholarship holder.

References

 Profile
 sports-reference

1973 births
Living people
Flyweight boxers
Boxers at the 2000 Summer Olympics
Olympic boxers of Australia
People from the Northern Territory
Australian Institute of Sport boxers
Australian male boxers